Käthe Köhler (born 10 November 1913; date of death unknown) was a German diver who competed in the 1936 Summer Olympics. In 1936 she won the bronze medal in the 10 metre platform event.

References

1913 births
Year of death missing
German female divers
Olympic divers of Germany
Divers at the 1936 Summer Olympics
Olympic bronze medalists for Germany
Olympic medalists in diving
Medalists at the 1936 Summer Olympics
20th-century German women